Band Khirkyon Kay Peechay (Behind The Closed Windows) is a drama that airs on TVOne Global.

A 22 episode serial that opened up the private lives of rich women for the first time in Pakistan turned out to be a groundbreaking serial by Shaqielle. For the first time, he provoked a certain rebellious streak in his style which was essentially decorative, favouring both big and small vistas of frames, dramatic atmosphere of top warm lighting, atmospheric use of sun and indoor lights, avid emotional encounters and an uninterrupted storytelling technique. Stylistically and dramatically a characterize work by overloaded: wary of simplicity serious in-depth analysis of characters by merging a melodramatic form of realism to it.

This is a popular fiction story of the Musharraf Government, part of "Roshan Pakistan", which represents the top 1% elite class in Pakistan. The serial was directed by Shaqiele Khan, produced by S. Aashan Abbas and written by Sameera Fazal

Cast
 Sanam Baloch
 Saba Hamid
 Rubina Ashraf
 Jia Ali
 Sabahat Ali Bukhari
 Shakil Akhtar Imf
 Ayesha Toor
 Sonia Rehman
 Shamim Hilali
 Ali Afzal
 Noman Masood
 Ejaz Aslam
 Shamoon Abbasi

References

External links
 Official Website

Pakistani drama television series
Urdu-language television shows
TVOne Pakistan